This is a list of association football games played by the Denmark national football team from 1990 to 1999. During the 1990s, the Danish national team played 102 games, winning 52, drawing 27, and losing 23. In these games, they scored 140 goals, while conceding 83 to their opponents. The first game of the 1990s was the 5 February 1990 game against the United Arab Emirates, the 537th overall Danish national team game. The last game of the 1990s was the 17 November 1999 game against Israel, the 638th game of the Danish national team.

Key
EC – European Championship match
ECQ – European Championship Qualifying match
F – Friendly match
IC1 - Artemio Franchi Trophy
IC2 - Confederations Cup
OT - Other tournament(s)
WC – World Cup match
WCQ – World Cup Qualifying match

Games
Note that scores are written Denmark first

See also
List of Denmark national football team results
Denmark national football team statistics

Sources
Landsholdsdatabasen  at Danish Football Association
A-LANDSKAMPE - 1990 - 1999 at Haslund.info

1990
1990–91 in Danish football
1991–92 in Danish football
1992–93 in Danish football
1993–94 in Danish football
1994–95 in Danish football
1995–96 in Danish football
1996–97 in Danish football
1997–98 in Danish football
1998–99 in Danish football
1999–2000 in Danish football